Summerfield is an English surname. Notable people with the surname include:

Adam Summerfield (born 1990), professional ice hockey goaltender
Arthur Summerfield (1899–1972), American politician
Derek Summerfield, psychiatrist
Eleanor Summerfield (1921–2001), British actress
Kevin Summerfield (born 1959), English football coach
Luke Summerfield (born 1987), English footballer
Paddy Summerfield (born 1947), professional photographer
Rob Summerfield, American politician
Rose Summerfield (1864–1922), Australian feminist

Fictional characters:
Bernice Summerfield, character in novels and audio plays based on the television series Doctor Who

English-language surnames